The Sault aux Cochons River flows south, on the north shore of the Saint Lawrence River, in the La Haute-Côte-Nord Regional County Municipality in the administrative region of Côte-Nord, in Quebec, in Canada. This watercourse successively crosses the townships of Amos, Le Baillif, Bayfield and Miller. It also crosses the zec de Forestville, then flows into the estuary of Saint Lawrence at Forestville.

Toponymy 

The toponym Sault aux Cochons river has been known since the 17th Century thanks to Louis Jolliet who indicated it in his writings under the spelling “sault au Cochon”. This toponym evokes the presence of porpoises, called pigs or sea pigs in popular language, at the mouth of this river. In addition, this name identifies around ten geographic entities along the shores of the St. Lawrence River, visited by porpoises for centuries. The change from the singular to the plural was observed at the beginning of the 20th century; finally the plural form was officially recognized in 1950 by the Commission de géographie du Québec.

The toponym Rivière du Sault aux Cochons was made official on December 5, 1968, at the Place Names Bank of the Commission de toponymie du Québec.

Geography 

It then flows in a southwesterly direction and crosses Sault aux Cochons Lake halfway through. It flows over a length of  according to the Commission de toponymie du Québec or of  according to the Organisme des basins versants de la Haute-Côte-Nord to flow into the St. Lawrence River at Forestville. The fifteen kilometer downstream of Sault aux Cochons Lake is encased in a canyon.

The wetlands cover .

In 2003, a portion of the waters of the Sault aux Cochons River was diverted to the Pipmuacan reservoir by the Lionnet River in order to increase the capacity of the power stations Bersimis-1 and Bersimis-2.

History 
The river was used for timber floating until the early 1990s.

Terrestrial avifauna 
The main bird species in this watershed include: the ruffed grouse, woodcock, spruce grouse and willow ptarmigan.

According to the Atlas of the Breeding Birds of Southern Quebec, 125 species are recorded in the Sault aux Cochons River basin. The greatest diversity in the study area was observed
in the Atlas Square which encompasses the St. Lawrence River, the Sault aux Cochons River estuary and the first 10 kilometers of the river. In this sector, 96 species have been identified, among which, species usually associated with the Saint Lawrence River, such as common eider and black guillemot.

On May 26, 1999, an aerial survey by helicopter enabled the identification of 12 species of aquatic birds between the mouth of the Sault aux Cochons River and the Lionnet River, including the Sault aux Cochons Lake. Anatidae were the most represented group with 9 species and the most abundant with 111 individuals.

Canoe and kayak 
The Sault aux Cochons River is considered to be canoeable on its entire route.

See also 

 List of rivers of Quebec

References

Bibliography 
 .
 .

Rivers of Côte-Nord
La Haute-Côte-Nord Regional County Municipality